Last of the Dogmen is a 1995 American Western film written and directed by Tab Murphy (in his feature directorial debut). It stars Tom Berenger, Barbara Hershey, Kurtwood Smith, and Steve Reevis. Set in the mountains of northwest Montana, United States, near the Idaho, United States, and Canadian borders, the film is about a bounty hunter who tracks escaped convicts into a remote region and encounters an unknown band of Dog Soldiers from a tribe of Cheyenne Indians. The film was shot on location in Alberta and British Columbia, Canada, as well as in Mexico.

Plot 
Distraught but skillful bounty hunter Lewis Gates, accompanied by his horse and faithful companion Zip, an Australian cattle dog, tracks three armed escaped convicts into Montana's Oxbow Quadrangle, at the persistence of his unforgiving ex-father-in-law, who blames Gates for his daughter's tragic death. Gates sees the convicts but hears shots. Investigating the scene, all Gates finds is a bloody scrap of cloth, "enough blood to paint the sheriff's office," a bloody shotgun shell, and an old-fashioned Indian arrow.

Gates takes the arrow to archaeologist Lillian Sloan, who identifies it as a replica of the arrows used by Cheyenne Dog Soldiers. Gates doesn't think it's a replica and, after some library research, develops a long list of people who have disappeared into the Oxbow. He also finds a story of a "wild child" captured in the woods in the early 20th century. Now, he's convinced that the fugitives were killed by a tribe of Dog Soldiers, a hardy band of Native Americans who somehow escaped the 1864 Sand Creek massacre and survived for 128 years, secluded in the Montana Wilderness, killing anyone who threatened to find and expose them.

Gates convinces Sloan to join him in a search for the band. The two enter the Oxbow and begin to search. They survive many mishaps and bond throughout their journey, eventually venturing deeper into the wilderness than Gates has ever gone before, around 50 miles in.

After a week and nearing the end of their supplies, Sloan suggests heading back. As the two are packing their gear, they are suddenly attacked by Cheyenne Indians. Sloan, speaking the Cheyenne language, deescalates the situation, and the two are taken captive by Yellow Wolf. They are taken to the Cheyenne encampment in a valley accessed through a tunnel behind a waterfall, where the duo meet the village leader Spotted Elk. He tells them of the escape and salvation of the Cheyenne 128 years ago, as well as his own run-in with the "white people" when he was a child.

Gates and Sloan slowly become friendly with the Cheyenne. However, Yellow Wolf's son is sick, wounded after the gunfight with the convicts. Despite the elder's concerns, Sloan convinces Yellow Wolf to allow Gates to ride into town to obtain antibiotics. In town, Gates robs the pharmacy and is chased by local law enforcement, including Sheriff Deegan, his father-in-law.

After escaping, Gates meets Yellow Wolf in the wilderness, and they return to the Cheyenne camp. By this time, the sheriff has gathered a posse and sets out to hunt down Gates both for robbing the store and to find Gates' female companion, whom the sheriff believes Gates has hiding in the Oxbow.

Gates and Sloan continue to grow closer to the Cheyenne, and Sloan discloses that they are indeed the last of their kind. However, Yellow Wolf shows Gates that the sheriff is following his trail and is slowly getting closer to the encampment. Knowing that if discovered, the Cheyenne will fight and die, Gates proposes a solution; using some leftover TNT the Cheyenne had taken from explorers many years earlier, he will create a distraction and allow the Cheyenne to flee deeper inside the Oxbow and live in peace, far away from civilization. Sloan decides to stay with the Cheyenne, which Gates reluctantly agrees to.

The two share a passionate kiss, and Gates begins to set up his plan. Gates gives himself up to the sheriff and pleads with him to leave the wilderness. However, the sheriff discovers the hidden tunnel and prepares to enter it. Escaping, Gates attempts to light the TNT with a rifle, but the sheriff stops him and threatens him with a gun to his head. Yellow Wolf appears, surprising the sheriff, and fires an arrow at the TNT, setting it off.

Gates and the sheriff are propelled out of the tunnel into the waterfall. Gates saves the sheriff, who is badly wounded. The deputy tells everyone to clear out, and they all head back to town to treat the wounded sheriff and Gates.

In Gates' holding cell, the sheriff confronts him about what Gates saw. Gates relents and says some things don't need an explanation; they deserve to remain undiscovered. This seemingly helps smooth over Gates' and the sheriff's relationship.

Sloan and the Cheyenne are shown to have successfully escaped. An indeterminate time later, Gates has begun searching for them in heavy snow. Using hints provided by Sloan, he is able to find them. The film ends with Zip running toward Gates as he enters a clearing and a passionate embrace between Sloan and Gates.

Cast 

 Tom Berenger as Lewis Gates
 Barbara Hershey as Prof. Lillian Diane ("L.D.") Sloan
 Kurtwood Smith as Sheriff Deegan
 Steve Reevis as Yellow Wolf
 Andrew Miller as Briggs
 Gregory Scott Cummins as Sears
 Mark Boone Junior as Tattoo
 Helen Calahasen as Yellow Wolf's wife
 Eugene Blackbear as Spotted Elk
 Dawn Lavand as Indian Girl
 Sidel Standing Elk as Lean Bear
 Hunter Bodine as Kid
 Graham Jarvis as Pharmacist
 Marvin R. Thunderbull as Wolfscout
 Parley Baer as Mr. Hollis
 Molly Parker as Nurse
 Antony Holland as Doc Carvey
 Robert Donley as Old Timer
 Brian Stollery as Grad Student
 Mitchell LaPlante as Wild Boy
 Wilford Brimley as The Narrator
 Zip as Zip

Production 
Last of the Dogmen was Tab Murphy's directorial debut; he wrote the screenplay in the early-1980s and producer Joel B. Michaels bought the film rights. The film was budgeted at $25 million and was expected to have an 11-week shooting schedule.

Filming locations included:
 Banff National Park, Alberta, Canada 
 Canmore, Alberta, Canada
 Kananaskis Country, Alberta, Canada 
 Yoho National Park, British Columbia, Canada
 Takakkaw Falls
 Cuernavaca, Morelos, Mexico

Reception 
Last of the Dogmen holds a 69% "Fresh" rating on Rotten Tomatoes. Roger Ebert of The Chicago Sun-Times gave the movie 3 out of 4 stars, describing it as "an absorbing story, well told" and carried by Berenger's  unpretentious performance, but he felt the final act descended into clichés and failed to live up to the intriguing premise.

Alternate releases 
The American theatrical and home video releases of this film included third-person narration by Wilford Brimley, which is absent from the UK version. The DVD allows the viewer to choose. A limited version available to watch on Netflix until October 19, 2020, featured another alternate narrated by Kurtwood Smith.

References

External links 

 
 
 
 
 

1995 films
1995 independent films
1995 directorial debut films
1990s mystery films
1995 Western (genre) films
American independent films
American mystery films
American Western (genre) films
Carolco Pictures films
1990s English-language films
Films scored by David Arnold
Films about Native Americans
Films set in the 1990s
Films set in Montana
Films shot in Alberta
Films shot in British Columbia
Films shot in Mexico
Films with screenplays by Tab Murphy
Neo-Western films
1990s American films